Icicle Creek is a  non navigable stream in the U.S. state of Washington. It originates at Josephine Lake near the crest of the Cascade Range and flows generally east to join the Wenatchee River near Leavenworth. Icicle Creek's drainage basin is mountainous and mostly undeveloped land within the Wenatchee National Forest and the Alpine Lakes Wilderness. The final  of the creek are moderately developed with scattered homes and pasture, a golf course, children's camp, a small housing development called Icicle Island Club, and the Leavenworth National Fish Hatchery. Some water is diverted from the creek for municipal use by the City of Leavenworth at Icicle Creek river mile 5.6. Near Leavenworth, the wheelchair-accessible Icicle Creek Nature Trail, a National Recreation Trail designated in 2005, runs  along a historic creek channel.

Icicle Creek's name comes from the Indian word na-sik-elt, meaning narrow canyon. According to Albert H. Sylvester, topographer and Forest Service surveyor for many years, "Place the letter n at the beginning of icicle and the letter t at its end, and you practically have the Indian word."
Original patents was Northern pacific railroad patent number #32 Joseph Scott patent number #907 George Briskey patent number #516

Course
Icicle Creek begins as the outlet of Josephine Lake, less than a mile from the crest of the Cascade Range and the headwaters of Tunnel Creek, a tributary of the west-flowing Skykomish River. Stevens Pass is a few miles north of the lake. The Pacific Crest Trail passes along the lake's western side. Icicle Creek flows south from the lake through a deep and narrow valley. After a few miles it turns southeast and its valley takes on a classic glacier-carved U-shape. Icicle Creek begins to turn more directly south near river mile 22, just after Spanish Camp Creek joins from the northeast. Spanish Camp Creek and its headwater tributaries drain the high alpine western side of Icicle Ridge from Grindstone Mountain to Cape Horn and Ladies Pass.

Shortly below the Spanish Camp Creek confluence Icicle Creek is joined by French Creek from the west. French Creek is one of the main tributaries of Icicle Creek. It flows for miles through a deep U-shaped valley. Its many tributaries drain a number peaks and ridges along the crest of the Wenatchee Mountains, including Granite Mountain, The Cradle, and Highchair Mountain. Near the end of French Creek's valley is Paddy-Go-Easy Pass, which leads to the Cle Elum River valley. Below the French Creek confluence Icicle Creek leaves the Alpine Lake Wilderness and is soon after joined from the south by Black Pine Creek, which enters Icicle Creek river mile 20. Black Pine Campground is located near the confluence. Boggy Creek joins from the north near the Rock Island Campground. About a mile below that Icicle Creek is joined from the south by Jack Creek, another major tributary. Like French Creek, Jack Creek flows through a long, deep U-shaped valley, draining a portion of the crest of the Wenatchee Mountains. Jack Creek originates in several headwater streams draining a high alpine region near Stuart Pass, Ingalls Peak, and Mount Stuart.

Below Jack Creek Icicle Creek is joined from the north by Chatter Creek. Chatter Creek Campground is located on the north side of Icicle Creek near the mouth of Chatter Creek. Several tributaries join below Chatter Creek, such as Hoxsey, Bob, Doctor, Ida, Big Slide, Jay, Johnny, and Victoria creeks. Eponymous campgrounds are located at the Ida and Johnny Creek confluences. A number of small streams join below Victoria Creek, such as Fourth of July Creek. Bridge Creek joins from the north at Bridge Creek Campground.

At river mile 8 Icicle Creek is joined by Eightmile Creek, a larger tributary. Eightmile Creek and its tributaries Mountaineer Creek and Pioneer Creek drain a large area to the southwest, reaching to the crest of the Wenatchee Mountains. There are a number of lakes in the Eightmile Creek basin, including Eightmile Lake, Lake Caroline, Colchuck Lake, Lake Stuart, Jack Lake, and Horseshoe Lake. Major mountains drained include Mount Stuart, Sherpa Peak, Argonaut Peak, Colchuck Peak, and Dragontail Peak. These peaks are among the highest in the Wenatchee Mountains. Mount Stuart is the second-highest non-volcanic peak in Washington. These high mountains are known as the Stuart Range. The range contains a number of glaciers, notably Colchuck Glacier, Sherpa Glacier, and Stuart Glacier. Eightmile Campground is located on Icicle Creek just below the mouth of Eightmile Creek.

Below Eightmile Creek Icicle Creek is joined from the south by Rat Creek, which flows from Coney Lake on the northern slopes of Cannon Mountain, Enchantment Peaks, Prusik Peak, and Shield Lake on the northern skirt of The Temple. There are numerous mountain lakes in this region. Just above river mile 5 Icicle Creek is joined from the south by Snow Creek, a notable tributary. Snow Creek flows from the heart of The Enchantments region of high alpine lakes between Enchantment Peaks and the Stuart Range.

Below Snow Creek Icicle Creek exits the Wenatchee National Forest and enters a semi-developed area near Leavenworth. Its valley broadens and the creek meanders widely. It passes the Leavenworth National Fish Hatchery and a number of scattered houses before emptying into the Wenatchee River about a mile south of Leavenworth.

Natural history
According to monitoring data collected in 1993, Washington State Department of Ecology determined that the water quality of Icicle Creek was good and "met or exceeded expectations and is of lowest concern."

Tributaries

From down to upstream, hierarchically listed, not exhaustive:
 Snow Creek
 Toketie Creek
 Rat Creek
 Lion Creek
 Eightmile Creek
 Mountaineer Creek
 Pioneer Creek
 Bridge Creek
 Fourth of July Creek
 Mac Creek
 Victoria Creek
 Johnny Creek
 Jay Creek
 Big Slide Creek
 Ida Creek
 Doctor Creek
 Bob Creek
 Hoxsey Creek
 Chatter Creek
 Trout Creek
 Jack Creek
 Meadow Creek
 Van Epps Creek
 Boggy Creek
 Grindstone Creek
 Black Pine Creek
 French Creek
 Snowall Creek
 Spanish Camp Creek
 Frosty Creek
 Doughgod Creek
 Cuitin Creek
 Leland Creek
 Prospect Creek
 Chain Creek
 Trapper Creek
 Basin Creek

See also

 List of rivers of Washington

References

Rivers of Washington (state)
Rivers of Chelan County, Washington
Climbing areas of the United States
Wenatchee National Forest